IAAC is an abbreviation that could stand for the following:
Indo-American Arts Council, an American non-profit cultural organization that promotes Indian culture
Institute for Advanced Architecture of Catalonia, international centre of education and research in Catalonia
Irish American Athletic Club, an athletic club in the United States
International Assets Holding Corporation, a Fortune 500 integrated commodity risk management company whose NASDAQ identifier is IAAC
International Academy of Advanced Conducting after Ilya Musin, a week-long orchestral conducting workshop (hosted twice a year) based on the techniques established by Ilya Musin.